The 1962 Kentucky Derby was the 88th running of the Kentucky Derby. The race took place on May 5, 1962. Decidedly's winning time set a new Derby record (later broken).

Full results

Winning Breeder: George A. Pope, Jr.; (CA)

References

1962
Kentucky Derby
Derby
Kentucky
Kentucky Derby